Paceřice is a municipality and village in Liberec District in the Liberec Region of the Czech Republic. It has about 400 inhabitants.

Administrative parts
The village of Husa is an administrative part of Všelibice.

History
The first written mention of Paceřice is from 1543.

Notable people
Bohdan Kaminský (1859–1929), poet and translator

References

External links

Villages in Liberec District